The 2011 Tajik Football Super Cup was the 2nd Tajik Supercup match, a football match which was contested between the 2010 League and Cup champions, Istiklol, and the League runners-up, Regar-TadAZ.

Match details

See also
2010 Tajik League
2010 Tajik Cup

References

Super Cup
Tajik Supercup